The Ministry of Peace and Reconstruction is a Nepali ministry, tasked with ensuring peace and security. It was formed in 2007 after the Government signed the Comprehensive Peace Accord (CPA) with the Communist Party of Nepal (Maoist Centre) and is mandated to implement the CPA.

Former Ministers of Peace and Reconstruction
This is a list of all ministers of Peace and Reconstruction since the Nepalese Constituent Assembly election in 2013:

References

Peace and Reconstruction
Nepal